The Venezuela national under-18 and under-19 basketball team is a national basketball team of Venezuela, administered by the Federación Venezolana de Baloncesto.

It represents the country in international under-18 and under-19 (under age 18 and under age 19) basketball competitions.

See also
Venezuela national basketball team
Venezuela national under-17 basketball team
Venezuela women's national under-19 basketball team

References

External links
Venezuela Basketball Records at FIBA Archive

B
Men's national under-19 basketball teams